Sibikily is a village and principal settlement of the commune of Kita Nord in the Cercle of Kita in the Kayes Region of south-western Mali.

References

Populated places in Kayes Region